Liliane Klapisch is an Israeli painter.

Biography 
Liliane Klapisch was born in 1933, in Cachan, France.  She studied at the Académie Ranson, Paris from 1948 through 1949. Klapisch lived in Morocco from 1958 to 1959, and immigrated to Israel in 1969.  She lives and works in Jerusalem and Paris. Her work is in the Haifa Museum of Art, the Israel Museum, and the Tel Aviv Museum of Art.

Teaching 
 Adin Steinsaltz Academy, Israel, painting and sculpture

References

External links 
Bineth Gallery site for artist Liliane Klapisch

Further reading  
 Liliane Klapisch: paintings 1949–2001, Aya Luria, Muzeʼon Tel Aviv le-omanut, 2003

1933 births
Living people
20th-century Israeli women artists
21st-century Israeli women artists
Israeli painters
Israeli women painters
Sandberg Prize recipients